Franco Trappoli (born 5 November 1947) is an Italian politician, formerly of the Italian Socialist Party. He served as the mayor of Fano from 1980 to 1983 and was a member of the Italian Chamber of Deputies.

Biography 

Born in Orvieto in 1947, he graduated in the field of economic and commercial sciences.

He was the mayor of Fano from 1980 to 1983 and served as member of the Italian Chamber of Deputies from 1983 to 1987 and from 1992 to 1994.

He was the first Buddhist to become a member of the Italian Chamber of Deputies.

Notes

External links 
 Radio Radicale: Interview with Franco Trappoli

1947 births
Living people
People from Orvieto
Italian Buddhists
Italian Socialist Party politicians
Deputies of Legislature IX of Italy
Deputies of Legislature XI of Italy
Politicians of Marche
Politicians of Umbria